, also known as Ninnan, was a  after Eiman and before Kaō. This period spanned the years from August 1166 through April 1169.

Change of era
 February 3, 1166 : The new era name was created to mark an event or series of events. The previous era ended and a new one commenced in Eiman 2, on the 27th day of the 8th month of 1166.

Events of the Nin'an era
 1168 (Nin'an 3, 2nd month ):  Rokujō was deposed at age 5, and he received the title Daijō-daijin tennō.
 March 30, 1168 (Nin'an 3, 19th day of the 2nd month): In the 3rd year of Rokujō-tennōs reign (六条天皇3年), the emperor was deposed by his grandfather, and the succession (senso) was received by his cousin, the third son of the retired-Emperor Go-Shirakawa. Sometime thereafter, Emperor Takakura is said to have acceded to the throne (sokui), and he is proclaimed emperor.
 April 29, 1168 (Nin'an 3, 20th day of the 3rd month): Takakura succeeds Rokujo on the Chrysanthemum Throne.

References

Sources
 Brown, Delmer M. and Ichirō Ishida, eds. (1979).  Gukanshō: The Future and the Past. Berkeley: University of California Press. ;  OCLC 251325323
 Nussbaum, Louis-Frédéric and Käthe Roth. (2005).  Japan encyclopedia. Cambridge: Harvard University Press. ;  OCLC 58053128
 Titsingh, Isaac. (1834). Nihon Odai Ichiran; ou,  Annales des empereurs du Japon.  Paris: Royal Asiatic Society, Oriental Translation Fund of Great Britain and Ireland. OCLC 5850691
 Varley, H. Paul. (1980). A Chronicle of Gods and Sovereigns: Jinnō Shōtōki of Kitabatake Chikafusa. New York: Columbia University Press. ;  OCLC 6042764

External links 
 National Diet Library, "The Japanese Calendar" -- historical overview plus illustrative images from library's collection

Japanese eras
1160s in Japan